Sophronia chilonella is a moth of the family Gelechiidae. It was described by Treitschke in 1833. It is found in Spain, France, Italy, Germany, Denmark, Austria, the Czech Republic, Slovakia, Hungary, Poland, Norway, Sweden, the Baltic region, Russia, Ukraine, Belarus and Greece.

The wingspan is 11–13 mm.

The larvae feed on Artemisia campestris.

References

Moths described in 1833
Sophronia (moth)